Joe Kindregan  FIStructE, MIEI. is an Irish structural engineer born in 1954 in the Republic of Ireland

Early life and education 
Kindregan read civil engineering at University College, Dublin. In 1978 he took a PGDip  in Computing followed by a PGDip in Project Management at Trinity College, Dublin. In 1985 he took a PGDip in Legal Studies at Dublin Institute of Technology

Career 
From 1976-80 Kindregan worked in the Dublin office of Arup. In 1980 he moved to Abalkhail Consulting Engineers  until 1984 working in Dublin, Riyadh and Los Angeles. He returned to Dublin as a lecturer at the Dublin Institute of Technology becoming Head of the Department of Civil and Structural Engineering in 1992- a post he held until 2014. Since then Kindregan has been an independent consultant based in Co Kildare, Republic of Ireland. Kindregan is President of the Institution of Structural Engineers in 2019.

Awards and honours 
Winner of Pierce Malone Scholarship [3] [2]. at National University of Ireland, 1976,
 Association of Consulting Engineers of Ireland President's Award 2019

References 

Presidents of the Institution of Structural Engineers
Structural engineers
1954 births
Living people
20th-century Irish engineers
21st-century Irish engineers
Irish civil engineers
Irish expatriates in Saudi Arabia
People from County Kildare
Alumni of Dublin Institute of Technology
Alumni of Trinity College Dublin
Alumni of University College Dublin
Academics of Dublin Institute of Technology
Irish expatriates in the United States